This article show all participating team squads at the 2010 FIVB Women's Volleyball World Grand Prix, played by twelve countries with the final round held in Ningbo, China.

The following is the Brazil roster in the 2010 FIVB World Grand Prix.

The following is the China roster in the 2010 FIVB World Grand Prix.

The following is the Chinese Taipei roster in the 2010 FIVB World Grand Prix.

The following is the Dominican Republic roster in the 2010 FIVB World Grand Prix.

The following is the Germany roster in the 2010 FIVB World Grand Prix.

The following is the Italy roster in the 2010 FIVB World Grand Prix.

The following is the Japan roster in the 2010 FIVB World Grand Prix.

The following is the Netherlands roster in the 2010 FIVB World Grand Prix.

The following is the Poland roster in the 2010 FIVB World Grand Prix.

The following is the Puerto Rico roster in the 2010 FIVB World Grand Prix.

The following is the Thailand roster in the 2010 FIVB World Grand Prix.

The following is the United States roster in the 2010 FIVB World Grand Prix.

References

External links
FIVB

2010
2010 in volleyball